Mirage Men is a 2013 documentary film directed by John Lundberg, written by Mark Pilkington and co-directed by Roland Denning and Kypros Kyprianou. The film had its world premiere at the 2013 Sheffield Doc/Fest in the UK on 13 June 2013, its North American premiere at the 2013 Fantastic Fest in Austin, Texas on 22 September 2013, its Australian premiere at the Canberra International Film Festival on 31 October 2013 and its Nordic premiere at the Stockholm Film Festival in Sweden on 10 November 2013.

Mirage Men suggests there was conspiracy by the U.S. military to fabricate UFO folklore in order to deflect attention from classified aerospace projects. It prominently features Richard Doty, a retired Special Agent who worked for AFOSI, the United States Air Force Office of Special Investigation.
Mark Pilkington's book about the project, also called Mirage Men, was published in 2010 by Constable & Robinson.

Reception 

Critical reception for the documentary has been positive. Twitch Film said the film was "Scary, unsettling" and "offered profound food for thought". Electric Sheep magazine called it "one of the must see documentaries of the year". Ain't it Cool News called the film "a real head trip" and said they were "glued to [their] seat".

Influence 

Mirage Men has been excerpted in the Adam Curtis documentary HyperNormalisation on BBC iPlayer.

American novelist Ernest Cline credits the Mirage Men film as an influence on his novel and screenplay Armada in which the government has known for decades of an alien invasion and has been funding sci-fi films and videogames in order to prepare people for war.

References

External links 
 
 

2013 films
Documentary films about the United States
British documentary films
Documentary films about conspiracy theories
2013 documentary films
UFO hoaxes
2010s English-language films
2010s British films